Compute Node Linux (CNL) is a runtime environment based on the Linux kernel for the Cray XT3, Cray XT4, Cray XT5, Cray XT6, Cray XE6 and Cray XK6 supercomputer systems based on SUSE Linux Enterprise Server. CNL forms part of the Cray Linux Environment.  systems running CNL were ranked 3rd, 6th and 8th among the fastest supercomputers in the world.

See also
 INK (operating system)

References

External links 
 SUSE Linux Enterprise Server 

Cray software
Linux kernel variant